Gaston Peers de Nieuwburgh (28 December 1867 – 28 August 1922) was a Belgian polo player. He competed in the polo tournament at the 1920 Summer Olympics.

References

External links
 

1867 births
1922 deaths
Belgian polo players
Polo players at the 1920 Summer Olympics
Olympic polo players of Belgium
Sportspeople from Brussels